Koliswa Vimbayo is a South African politician who has represented the African National Congress (ANC) in the Eastern Cape Provincial Legislature since 2019. Until 2019, she was the Mayor of Chris Hani District Municipality.

Political career 
Vimbayo was formerly the Executive Mayor of Chris Hani and the Regional Chairperson of the ANC's branch in the area. She lost the latter position at a regional party conference in August 2018, when Wongama Gela won election to the position, securing 144 votes against Vimbayo's 29. The following year, in the 2019 general election, Vimbayo was elected to an ANC seat in the Eastern Cape Provincial Legislature, ranked 35th on the ANC's provincial party list.

References

External links 

 

African National Congress politicians
Living people
Year of birth missing (living people)
Members of the Eastern Cape Provincial Legislature
21st-century South African politicians
Women mayors of places in South Africa
21st-century South African women politicians